The 1986 IPSC Handgun World Shoot VII held in Florida, United States was the seventh IPSC Handgun World Shoot, and was won by Rob Leatham of United States.

Champions
Individual

Teams

See also 
IPSC Rifle World Shoots
IPSC Shotgun World Shoot
IPSC Action Air World Shoot

References

1986
1986 in shooting sports
Shooting competitions in the United States
1986 in American sports
International sports competitions hosted by the United States
Sports competitions in Florida
1986 in sports in Florida